Shulga is a gender-neutral Slavic surname. Notable people with the surname include:

Aleksandr Shulga (born 1975), Russian football player
Veronika Shulga (born 1981), Ukrainian football goalkeeper
Konstantin Shulga (born 1991), entrepreneur and co-founder of Finery Markets; Forbes 30 under 30 nominee

See also
 
 Shulha

Slavic-language surnames